The second season of Demark har talent aired on TV2 on 28 December 2015 and will finish in 2016. The series will be again host by Christopher Læssø and Felix Schmidt. On the judging panel Jarl Friis-Mikkelsen, Cecilie Lassen and Peter Frödin will return with new forth judge Nabiha while TopGunn won't return for his second season. Once again in this season the golden buzzer is available for each judge to press once the whole series to put one act straight through to the live shows.

Background 
It was announced Tv2 will make a second season of the show. It broadcast on 28 December 2015 and will finish early 2016

Host and judges 

The season host once again are Christopher Læssø and Felix Schmidt and the judges Jarl Friis-Mikkelsen, Cecilie Lassen and Peter Frödin with new forth judge Nabiha. TopGunn won't return for his second season.

Semi-finals
The semi finals will begin on 9 February 2016. 7 acts will perform every week. 2 acts will advanced from the public vote 1 act will advanced from the judges vote

Semi-final summary

Semi Finals 1

Semi Finals 2

Semi Finals 3

Semi Finals 4

Final 12 Part 1

Final 12 Part 2

Final

Semi-finalists

{|
|-
|}

2015 Danish television seasons
2016 Danish television seasons
Got Talent